Nanded North Assembly constituency is one of the 288 Vidhan Sabha (legislative assembly) constituencies of Maharashtra state in western India. This constituency is located in the Nanded district.

Members of Legislative Assembly

 1962-2008: Constituency Does not exist
 2009: D. P. Sawant, Indian National Congress
 2014: D P Sawant, Indian National Congress
 2019: Balaji Kalyankar, Shiv Sena

Election results

General elections 2009

General elections, 2014

General elections, 2019

References

Assembly constituencies of Maharashtra
Politics of Nanded district